Tuckman is a surname. Notable people with the surname include:

 Bruce Tuckman (born 1938), American psychologist
Diane Tuckman, American (born in Egypt) artist and author
 Frederick Tuckman, Member of the European Parliament
 Roy Tuckman, American radio personality

See also
 Tuchman
 Tuckman's stages of group development

English-language surnames